The Building at 1101–1113 Maple Avenue is a historic rowhouse building in Evanston, Illinois. Built in 1892, the three-story building includes seven attached rowhouses. Late nineteenth century rowhouses such as this were precursors to Evanston's suburban apartment buildings of the early twentieth century, which also offered house-like living in a multi-family setting. Architect S.H. Warner designed the building in the Queen Anne style. The building's design includes gambrel porch roofs, projecting bays, patterned shingle siding, and a corner turret.

The building was added to the National Register of Historic Places on March 15, 1984.

References

Buildings and structures on the National Register of Historic Places in Cook County, Illinois
Buildings and structures in Evanston, Illinois
Queen Anne architecture in Illinois
Residential buildings completed in 1892
Residential buildings on the National Register of Historic Places in Illinois